Dundas Valley Secondary School, abbreviated as DVSS, is a secondary school located in Dundas, Ontario. It is the result of the 2014 amalgamation of Highland Secondary School and Parkside High School.

References

High schools in Hamilton, Ontario
Dundas, Ontario
2014 establishments in Ontario
Educational institutions established in 2014